The Light House  is a private house in London that won a 2006 RIBA Award and was also short-listed for the 2006 Manser Medal for Architecture. It was designed by the firm of architects Gianni Botsford with environmental and structural engineering by Arup Group.

The project inserted a new house, accessed through an archway into the end of a Victorian mews. It was completed in 2005.

The house has been called "one of the finest new city homes to be found anywhere in the world"  and has been the location for celebrity and fashion shoots.

Site and brief
The site was a backland development surrounded by buildings on all sides. After studying the fall of light throughout the year on the site, the decision was made to build a courtyard-style house where wide open spaces and courtyards make the most of natural light while maximising privacy.

References

External links
Gianni Botsford Architects, Light House
Bright Fantastic
Hidden House of Light
Decoding Courtyard Living

Buildings and structures completed in 2005
Houses in the City of Westminster
Concrete buildings and structures
Modern architecture in the United Kingdom